"Absolutely No Decorum" is a song written by Ola Salo and recorded on the Ark's album Prayer for the Weekend and only became available through digital download. The single peaked at 26th position at the Swedish singles chart.

During the 5th week the song entered Trackslistan where its list successes made it one of the greatest Trackslistan hits of 2007. The song was originally performed at "P3 Guld" in January 2007, and charted at Svensktoppen for eight weeks between 18 February-8 April 2007, before getting knocked out, peaking at 4th position.

Charts

References

2007 singles
2007 songs
The Ark (Swedish band) songs
English-language Swedish songs
Songs written by Ola Salo